Solemn proceedings is the term used in Scotland for serious criminal cases prosecuted on indictment before a judge and jury. These are distinct from summary proceedings before a sheriff or justice of the peace sitting without a jury.

See also
 Indictable offence
 Trial by jury in Scotland

Scottish criminal law